Cinédis was a French film distribution company active from the 1930s to the 1960s, releasing a mixture of French films and dubbed imports from aboard. The company enjoyed its strongest years during the 1950s, when French audience numbers reached their peak. It handled a number of co-productions between France and Italy. The artist René Ferracci designed many of the company's posters.

Selected filmography

 A Man of Gold (1934)
 Holiday for Henrietta (1952)
 The Wages of Fear (1953)
 Ali Baba and the Forty Thieves (1954)
 House of Ricordi (1954)
 Wild Fruit (1954)
 Knave of Hearts (1954)
 Flesh and the Woman (1954)
 Madame du Barry (1954)
 Marianne of My Youth (1955)
 Black Dossier (1955)
 Spring, Autumn and Love (1955)
 Les Diaboliques (1955)
 Don Camillo's Last Round (1955)
 The Grand Maneuver (1955)
 Madelon (1955)
 Race for Life (1955)
 Elena and Her Men (1956)
 L'homme aux clefs d'or (1956)
 Paris, Palace Hotel (1956)
 Fernandel the Dressmaker (1956)
 Le secret de soeur Angèle (1956)
 Le couturier de ces dames (1956)
 Death in the Garden (1956)
 Women's Club (1956)
 A Kiss for a Killer (1957)
 Les Espions (1957)
 On Foot, on Horse, and on Wheels (1957)
 Gates of Paris (1957)
 Mademoiselle and Her Gang (1957)
 La Parisienne (1957)
 Vacanze a Ischia (1957)
 Send a Woman When the Devil Fails (1957)
 No Sun in Venice (1957)
 He Who Must Die (1957)
 Anna of Brooklyn (1958)
 Cette nuit là... (1958)
 La legge è legge (1958)
 En cas de malheur (1958)
 Resurrection (1958)
 Too Late to Love (1959)
 Du rififi chez les femmes (1959)
 Fortunat (1960)
 Classe Tous Risques (1960)
 Wasteland (1960)
 The Nina B. Affair (1961)
 All the Gold in the World (1961)
 The Devil and the Ten Commandments (1962)
 Emile's Boat (1962)
 Jules and Jim (1962)
 How to Succeed in Love (1962)
 The Trip to Biarritz (1963)
 Mare matto (1963)
 Shéhérazade (1963)

References

Bibliography
 Smith, Ian Hayden. Selling the Movie: The Art of the Film Poster. Quarto Publishing Group, 2018.

French film studios
Film distributors of France